Meysəri (also Meysary) is a village and municipality in the Shamakhi District of Azerbaijan. It has a population of 624. The village had an Armenian population before the exodus of Armenians from Azerbaijan after the outbreak of the Nagorno-Karabakh conflict.

In Meysary there were two Armenian Apostolic churches: Surb Nshan and Surb Astvatsatsin. Surb Astvatsatsin was blown up in 1972.

References

External links 

Populated places in Shamakhi District